Thomas Farnham may refer to:
 Thomas J. Farnham (1804–1848), explorer and author of the American West
 Thomas Farnham (Brookside)
 Thomas Farnham (MP) (died 1562), Member of Parliament for Gatton, Leicester and East Grinstead